Belize Botanic Gardens (BBG) is  of native and exotic plants growing in the Cayo district of western Belize. The garden is in a valley on the banks of the Macal River, surrounded by the Maya Mountain foothills.

The main focus of BBG is encouraging sustainable agriculture, maintaining conservation collections and engaging in conservation education. They aim to inspire visitors to protect plants and their habitats by learning more about the world of plants.

Mayan archaeological sites in the vicinity include Chaa Creek, Cahal Pech and Xunantunich.

Reference notes

Cayo District
Macal River
Parks in Belize